PS Tredagh was a paddle steamer passenger vessel operated by the Drogheda Steam Packet Company from 1876 to 1902 and the  Lancashire and Yorkshire Railway from 1902 to 1912.

History

She was built by A. & J. Inglis of Glasgow for the Drogheda Steam Packet Company for service between Drogheda and Liverpool. Ownership was transferred to the Lancashire and Yorkshire Railway in 1902 when they took over the business of the Drogheda company.

The name Tredagh is a corruption of the name Drogheda.

The LYR took delivery of two new screw steamers, Colleen Bawn and Mellifont, in 1903 for the Drogheda-Liverpool route. In 1904 the Tredagh was withdrawn from service and sold; she was scrapped that year at Preston.

References

1876 ships
Passenger ships of the United Kingdom
Steamships of the United Kingdom
Ships built in Glasgow
Ships of the London and North Western Railway
Ships of the Lancashire and Yorkshire Railway
Paddle steamers of the United Kingdom
1876 establishments in Scotland